Campagne (meaning "countryside") may refer to several places:

France

Campagne is the name or part of the name of several communes in France:

 Campagne, Dordogne, in the Dordogne department
 Campagne, Hérault, in the Hérault department
 Campagne, Landes, in the Landes department
 Campagne, Oise, in the Oise department
 Campagne, former commune of the Somme department, now part of Quesnoy-le-Montant
 Campagne-d'Armagnac, in the Gers department
 Campagne-lès-Boulonnais, in the Pas-de-Calais department
 Campagne-lès-Guines, in the Pas-de-Calais department
 Campagne-lès-Hesdin, in the Pas-de-Calais department
 Campagne-lès-Wardrecques, in the Pas-de-Calais department
 Campagne-sur-Arize, in the Ariège department
 Campagne-sur-Aude, in the Aude department
 Gare de Campagne

Haiti
 Campagne, Haiti, a rural settlement in the Jérémie commune

Ireland
 Campagne (restaurant), Kilkenny

Netherlands
 Campagne, a neighbourhood in Maastricht, Limburg province

See also 
 Carmen Campagne (1959-2018), Canadian singer and children's entertainer
 Pain de campagne, a French bread